Ofu is a Local Government Area in the central part of Kogi State, Federal Republic of Nigeria, the Niger River forming its western boundary. Its headquarters are in the town of Ogwoawo (or Ugwalawo or Gwalawo) to the south of the area at.

The northeasterly line of equal latitude and longitude passes through the LGA.
 
It has an area of 1,680 km and a population of 192,169 at the 2006 census.

The postal code of the area is 271.

References

Local Government Areas in Kogi State